Lysmatidae is a family of caridean shrimp in the order Decapoda.

Genera
Exhippolysmata Stebbing, 1915
Ligur Sarato, 1885
Lysmata Risso, 1816
Lysmatella Borradaile, 1915
Mimocaris Nobili, 1903

References

Decapod families
Alpheoidea